HMHS Gloucester Castle (His Majesty's Hospital Ship) was a steam ship originally built for the Union-Castle Line, but requisitioned for use as a British hospital ship during the First World War.  On 30 March 1917 she was torpedoed by German U-boat UB-32. She was, however, salvaged, and returned to civilian service after the war. She was sunk by the German commerce raider Michel in 1942 off Ascension Island in the South Atlantic.

History
In the First World War Gloucester Castle served as a hospital ship. 
She was torpedoed off the Isle of Wight by German U-boat UB-32 (Kapitänleutnant Max Viebeg) on 30 March 1917. Three died during the transfer of crew and wounded but she was able to be towed back to port after two weeks.

After the war she was returned to her owners on 9 September 1919 for service on the intermediate routes and later served on the round-Africa service, earning the nickname 'Go Slowster Castle' because of her inadequate speed.

In the Second World War she remained in civilian service as a passenger and general cargo liner. On 15 July 1942, off the coast of Angola, she was intercepted by the German auxiliary cruiser Michel. Michel's commander KzS Helmuth von Ruckteschell chose to attack after dark without warning. The first shells from Michel destroyed the bridge and radio room and, consequently, no S.O.S. was transmitted. The ship sank with 93 killed, including the Master, Herbert H. Rose, six woman passengers, and two children. The remaining 61 survivors were picked up by the Michel and interned at Yokohama, Japan. After repatriation, the survivors reported the conditions under which they were forced to work and live.

See also
 List of hospital ships sunk in World War I

References

External links

 

1911 ships
Cargo liners
Ships built on the River Clyde
Hospital ships in World War I
Maritime incidents in 1917
Maritime incidents in July 1942
Ships of the Union-Castle Line
World War II shipwrecks in the Atlantic Ocean
Saint Helena and Dependencies in World War II